Ministry of Information Technology may refer to:

 Ministry of Information Technology and Telecommunication, cabinet level ministry of the Pakistan
 Ministry of Electronics and Information Technology (India)
 Ministry of Communications and Information Technology (India)
 Ministry of Information Technology (West Bengal), India